Thiel College is a private college in Greenville, Pennsylvania. It is affiliated with the Evangelical Lutheran Church in America and is one of the smallest colleges or universities in the region with about 100 full-time and part time faculty members.

History 
Founded in 1866 as a coeducational institution, Thiel College started as a result of a meeting between the Rev. Dr. William Passavant and A. Louis Thiel. At the Lutheran Church Pittsburgh Synod convention in Greensburg in 1869, it was decided that Thiel Hall would become a college and serve western Pennsylvania. Thiel College began its corporate existence on September 1, 1870. It was originally located in Philipsburg, now Monaca. It moved to Greenville in 1871.

On August 1, 2016, Susan Traverso left her position as provost of Elizabethtown College and became the 20th and the first female president of Thiel College.

Today, Thiel is home to about 110 full- and part-time faculty members. According to the US Department of Education, the school has just under 1,000 students in attendance. In 2016 and 2018, Forbes Magazine rated Thiel among the top ROI colleges in the U.S. In 2018, Colleges of Distinction recognized Thiel overall for the third consecutive year, and its Business and Education programs were singled out for their excellence for the second straight year.

Thiel College awarded Amelia Earhart an honorary degree in 1932. In his book “The Search for Amelia Earhart,” author Fred Goerner said, “The most satisfying recognition, however, came from her father’s alma mater, Thiel College of Greenville, Pennsylvania in the form of an honorary Doctor of Science degree.”

Thiel was also the first institution to grant an honorary degree to Fred Rogers in 1969. Rogers’ address at Thiel was titled "Encouraging Creativity." According to the Fred Rogers Archive, the presentation was so popular that to meet the requests for it, they had copies printed in advance for immediate distribution. In his address, he admonished educators and society in general for forcing conformity on children and encouraged understanding and tolerance as children endeavored to find their gifts. Thiel College also presented an honorary degree to Richard M. Nixon in 1959, when he was U.S. vice-president.

Campus 

Thiel is situated on a wooded 2000-acre campus in the small western Pennsylvania town of Greenville, which is about halfway between Cleveland and Pittsburgh.

Thiel has an enrollment of around 790 students. The student body is 56% male and 44% female. 63% percent of students are from Pennsylvania, 33% are from other states and Puerto Rico, and the remaining 4% are international students. 19% of students are minorities. The college has a student:faculty ratio of about 10:1, and 61% of classes have 20 or fewer students.

Since 2009, Thiel has invested more than $80 million in new and enhanced facilities. The school recently opened the new Haer Family Science and Arts Connector and a competition-certified track and field complex in the fall of 2017 and remodeled the Maenpa court in the fall of 2022.

Academics 

Thiel offers Bachelor of Arts and Bachelor of Science degrees in more than 60 majors, minors, and areas of study. It also offers five Master's degree programs. Thiel is accredited by the Middle States Commission on Higher Education Pennsylvania Department of Education, with some programs accredited by specialized accreditors such as the American Chemical Society.

Athletics 
The Thiel Tomcats compete in NCAA Division-III athletics, in the Presidents' Athletic Conference. Tomcats currently field teams in baseball, men's and women's basketball, cheerleading, dance, men's and women's cross country, football, men's and women's golf, men's and women's lacrosse, men's and women's soccer, softball, men's and women's tennis, men's and women's indoor track & field, men's and women's outdoor track & field, men's and women's volleyball, USA Rugby sanctioned men's and women's clubs, and wrestling. In 2017, Thiel began offering Equestrian Studies as a minor. Thiel also offers a variety of fun and competitive intramural sports throughout the year. Thiel recently hired a new athletic director, Jason Fautas, on September 12, 2022.

Championships 
"The Thiel College cheer team finished second Friday at the National Cheerleaders Association (NCA) College Nationals in Daytona, Fla.

Competing in the Open Spirit Rally category, the Tomcats scored a 92.8 Friday."

"The Thiel College men’s volleyball team beat the tournament’s top two seeds on its way to the program’s first conference championship with a 3-1 win over Wittenberg in the Allegheny Mountain Collegiate Conference men’s volleyball championship on Saturday, April 14, 2019."

"The Thiel College wrestling team won its 23rd President’s Athletic Conference championship on Saturday, Feb. 12, 2022 at Waynesburg University’s Rudy Marisa Fieldhouse."

The Tomcats earned the second seed in the tournament after finishing the regular season with a 28-12 overall record and a 17-7 record in the PAC in 2016.

Student life 
Thiel offers a variety of activities, clubs and organizations, and leadership opportunities, including 28 honorary societies and academic clubs, Greek life, leadership and service organizations, student government, a theatre troupe, multicultural and religious groups, marching and concert bands, and several choirs. The Thiel Activities Board provides a range of recreational activities.

Greek life at Thiel includes fraternities Kappa Sigma, Phi Theta Phi and Sigma Phi Epsilon; and sororities Alpha Xi Delta, Chi Omega, Sigma Kappa, and Zeta Tau Alpha.

Students can participate in TCTV, Thiel College television, to engage in weekly television programs regardless of major.

Living on campus 
Thiel guarantees housing for four years in residence halls, apartments, theme houses and townhouses. Nearly 88% of students live on campus. In addition to the Davis Square apartments, College Avenue Apartments and Townhouses, Thiel provides five dormitories for its students: Sawhill, Stewart, Bane, Hodge, and Florence West. Thiel provides five theme houses: Kappa Sigma house, Phi Theta Phi house, Alpha Xi Delta house, Sigma Kappa house, and Zeta Tau Alpha house. Other facilities on campus include a computer lab, career development center, IT Solution Center, Learning Commons, art gallery, a fitness center, multi-sport air-supported dome, theater, and cafeteria and bistro dining.

Notable alumni
 Mark Funkhouser ′71 (2007–2011), Mayor of Kansas City, Missouri
 Shirley M. Frye, mathematics educator, president of the NCTM, and Thiel distinguished alumnus for 1976
 Lynn Jones (1979–1986), former Major League Baseball (MLB) player (Detroit Tigers and Kansas City Royals) 
 Mark Nordenberg (1995-2014), Chancellor, University of Pittsburgh 
 Tom Regan, professor and writer, animal rights movement 
 Carl Aaron Swensson, American Lutheran minister; founder of Bethany College
 Jack M. Wilson (2003-2011), President, University of Massachusetts
 Phyllis Zimmerman, composer, choral conductor

References

External links
 Official website
 Official athletics website

 
Educational institutions established in 1866
Universities and colleges in Mercer County, Pennsylvania
1866 establishments in Pennsylvania
Private universities and colleges in Pennsylvania